The Hyundai Alcazar is a compact crossover SUV with three-row seating produced by the South Korean manufacturer Hyundai in India. Introduced in April 2021, it is a long-wheelbase version of the subcompact Creta, whilst having additional third-row seating, styling changes, and a different powertrain option.

Overview 
The Alcazar was first unveiled in April 2021, and was released to the market in June 2021. The longer body allows for a three-row seating, with 7-seater and 6-seater (with captain seats) options being offered. The vehicle is also introduced with a reworked front styling, and a larger 18-inch wheels.

In India, it is available in six variants, which are Prestige, Prestige (O), Platinum, Platinum (O), Signature, and Signature (O).

The Alcazar was released in Mexico in October 2021 as the Hyundai Creta Grand, and in South Africa in March 2022 as the Hyundai Grand Creta.

Powertrain 
The Alcazar is available with a 2.0-litre petrol engine and a 1.5-litre diesel, with the former has a claimed  acceleration figure of 9.5 seconds. Both engine options are available with a choice between a 6-speed manual gearbox and a 6-speed automatic transmission.

References

External links 

 Official website

Alcazar
Cars introduced in 2021
Compact sport utility vehicles
Crossover sport utility vehicles
Front-wheel-drive vehicles
Alcazar